This is a list of diplomatic missions in Iran. There are 90 embassies in Tehran, and many countries maintain consulates in other Iranian cities (not including honorary consulates).

Embassies in Tehran

Other posts in Tehran
 (interests section -  is the protecting power)
 (interests section - It is supervised by Ministry of Foreign Affairs of Egypt)
 (interests section -  is the protecting power)
 (interests section -  is the protecting power)

Gallery

Consulates-General/Consulates 
Ahvaz

Bandar Abbas

Chah Bahar
 (to open)

Isfahan

Gorgan

Kermanshah

Kish

Mashhad

 
 (to open)

 
 (to reopen)

Rasht

Shiraz
 
 (to open)

Tabriz

Urmia

Zahedan

Non-resident embassies accredited to Iran

Resident in Abu Dhabi, United Arab Emirates

Resident in Ankara, Turkey

Resident in Kuwait City, Kuwait

Resident in London, United Kingdom

Resident in New Delhi, India

Resident in Riyadh, Saudi Arabia

Resident in other cities 

 (Moscow)
 (Moscow)
 (New York City)
 (Doha)
 (Oslo)
 (Valletta)
 (Cairo)
 (Islamabad)
 (New York City)
 (Islamabad)
 (Singapore)
 (Addis Ababa)
 (Dubai)
 (Jakarta)

Embassies to open

Former Embassies 
 
 
 
  (closed in 2012)
  (closed in 2002)
 
 
 
  (closed in 1997) 
 
 
  (closed in 2012)

See also 
 List of diplomatic missions of Iran
 Visa requirements for Iranian citizens

Notes

References

External links 
 Ministry of Foreign Affairs of Iran

Foreign relations of Iran
Iran
Diplomatic missions in Iran